Yemmiganur Assembly constituency is a constituency of the Andhra Pradesh Legislative Assembly, India. It is one of 14 constituencies in the Kurnool district.

K.Chennakesava Reddy of YSR Congress Party is currently representing the constituency.

Overview
It is part of the Kurnool Lok Sabha constituency along with another six Vidhan Sabha segments, namely, Kurnool, Kodumur, Pattikonda, Mantralayam, Adoni and Alur in Kurnool district.

Mandals

Members of Legislative Assembly

Election results

2004

2009

2012 By-elections

2014

2019

See also
 List of constituencies of Andhra Pradesh Legislative Assembly

References

Assembly constituencies of Andhra Pradesh